There are two streams named the Little Ochlockonee River in southern Georgia in the United States.  Both are tributaries of the Ochlockonee River.

The smaller Little Ochlockonee River rises in Worth County north of Anderson City and flows south  into Colquitt County, joining the Ochlockonee east of Doerun.

See also
List of rivers of Georgia

References 

USGS Hydrologic Unit Map - State of Georgia (1974)

Rivers of Georgia (U.S. state)